The Cartography of York is the history of surveying and creation of maps of the city of York. The following is a list of historic maps of York:
c.1610: John Speed's map
 1624: Samuel Parsons' map of Dringhouses
 c1682: Captain James Archer's Plan of the Greate, Antient & Famous Citty of York
 1685: Jacob Richards' Survey of the City of York 
 1694: Benedict Horsley's Iconography or Ground Plot of ye City of Yorke
 1722: John Cossins: A New and Exact Plan of the City of York
 1748: re-issue of Cossins' New and Exact Plan with five new architectural illustrations across the upper edge of the engraving. These include the new County Hospital and the Assembly Rooms 
 1736: map in Francis Drake's Eboracum
 1784: William White's plan of York
 various: Tithe maps 
 1822: Alfred Smith's map, published in Edward Baines' History, Directory and Gazetteer of the county of York.
 1832: map by Robert Cooper
 1852: York Ordnance Survey 
 1858: Nathaniel Whittock’s Birds Eye View
 1900: Bacon's map of the environs of York 
 1909: Ordnance Survey map
 1937: Ordnance Survey map

Notes

Bibliography

Maps of England
Historic maps of Europe
Lists of maps
Cartography by city
Cartography